R. Smith may refer to:

R. D. Hilton Smith (1903–1974), Canadian librarian
R. Grant Smith (born 1939), American diplomat
R. Harlan Smith (born 1939), Canadian country music singer
R. Jeffrey Smith, Pulitzer Prize–winning American journalist
R. K. Smith (born 1937), American stock car racing driver
R. Thomas Smith or Tom Smith (1878–1957), American Thoroughbred racehorse trainer

See also
Robert Smith (disambiguation)